Mieczysław Żywczyński (13 January 1901 in Warsaw – 21 February 1978 in Lublin) was a Polish historian and priest. He was a professor of Catholic University of Lublin. He was a researcher of the Church's history and general history.

Notable works
 Watykan a sprawa polska w latach 1830-1837 (1935)
 Papiestwo i papieże średniowiecza (1938)
 Kościół i rewolucja francuska (1951)
 Metternich w świetle nowszej historiografii (1961)
 Historia powszechna 1789–1870 (1964)
 Włochy nowożytne 1796–1945 (1971)
 Szkice z dziejów radykalizmu chrześcijańskiego (1976)

References

Further reading
 

1901 births
1978 deaths
20th-century Polish historians
Polish male non-fiction writers
20th-century Polish Roman Catholic priests